Kumari Dilrukshi (born 18 January 1993) is a Sri Lankan rugby sevens player. She competed for Sri Lanka at the 2022 Commonwealth Games in Birmingham where they finished in eighth place.

References 

Living people
1993 births
Female rugby sevens players
Sri Lanka international women's rugby sevens players
Rugby sevens players at the 2022 Commonwealth Games